The 2011 Seattle Mariners season was the 35th season in franchise history. The Mariners finished the season with 67 wins and 95 losses.

Off-season

Coaching changes
Daren Brown, the Seattle Mariners interim manager during the 2010 season, stated that he had interest in returning as the full-time manager in 2011. On October 5, 2010, The Seattle Times reported that Mariners had requested and received permission from the Kansas City Royals to interview their bench coach John Gibbons, who previously served as the Toronto Blue Jays manager. The Seattle Times also reported that the Mariners interviewed Bobby Valentine and Lloyd McClendon for the open managerial position. On October 15, 2010, Eric Wedge was hired as the manager.

Death of Dave Niehaus
Long-time broadcaster Dave Niehaus suffered a myocardial infarction (heart attack) at his Bellevue, Washington, home on November 10, 2010, and died at age 75 while preparing to barbecue some ribs on his deck. Heart problems had forced Niehaus to undergo two angioplasties in 1996, causing him to give up smoking and change his diet. He is survived by his wife, three children, and six grandchildren. The team wore patches on their jerseys in commemoration of Niehaus during the 2011 season.

Regular season

Game log

|-  style="text-align:center; background:#bfb;"
| 1 || April 1 || @ Athletics || 6–2 || Hernández (1–0) || Breslow (0–1) ||  || 36,067 || 1–0 || 
|-  style="text-align:center; background:#bfb;"
| 2 || April 2 || @ Athletics || 5–2 || Ray (1–0) || Fuentes (0–1) || League (1) || 15,088 || 2–0 || 
|-  style="text-align:center; background:#fbb;"
| 3 || April 3 || @ Athletics || 1–7 || Gonzalez (1–0) || Fister (0–1) ||  || 22,292 || 2–1 || 
|-  style="text-align:center; background:#fbb;"
| 4 || April 4 || @ Rangers || 4–6 || Holland (1–0) || Bédard (0–1) || Feliz (1) || 37,618 || 2–2 || 
|-  style="text-align:center; background:#fbb;"
| 5 || April 5 || @ Rangers || 2–3 || Ogando (1–0) || Pineda (0–1) || Feliz (2) || 30,953 || 2–3 || 
|-  style="text-align:center; background:#fbb;"
| 6 || April 6 || @ Rangers || 3–7 || Wilson (1–0) || Hernández (1–1) ||  || 25,049 || 2–4 || 
|-  style="text-align:center; background:#fbb;"
| 7 || April 8 ||  Indians || 3–12 || Carrasco (1–1) || Vargas (0–1) ||  || 45,727 || 2–5 || 
|-  style="text-align:center; background:#fbb;"
| 8 || April 9 || Indians || 1–2 || Masterson (2–0) || Fister (0–2) || Perez (3) || 30,309 || 2–6 || 
|-  style="text-align:center; background:#fbb;"
| 9 || April 10 || Indians || 4–6 || Tomlin (2–0) || Bédard (0–2) || Perez (4) || 21,128 || 2–7 || 
|-  style="text-align:center; background:#bfb;"
| 10 || April 11 || Blue Jays || 8–7 || Lueke (1–0) || Camp (0–1) ||  || 13,056 || 3–7 || 
|-  style="text-align:center; background:#bfb;"
| 11 || April 12 || Blue Jays || 3–2 || Pineda (1–1) || Romero (1–1) || League (2) || 15,500 || 4–7 || 
|-  style="text-align:center; background:#fbb;"
| 12 || April 13 || Blue Jays || 3–8 || Rzepczynski (1–0) || Ray (1–1) ||  || 12,407 || 4–8 || 
|-  style="text-align:center; background:#fbb;"
| 13 || April 14 || @ Royals || 1–5 (8) || Chen (2–0) || Fister (0–3) ||  || 8,811 || 4–9 || 
|-  style="text-align:center; background:#fbb;"
| 14 || April 15 || @ Royals || 5–6 || Hochevar (2–1) || Bédard (0–3) || Soria (4) || 13,686 || 4–10 || 
|-  style="text-align:center; background:#fbb;"
| 15 || April 16 || @ Royals || 0–7 || O'Sullivan (1–1) || Hernández (1–2) ||  || 22,364 || 4–11 || 
|-  style="text-align:center; background:#bfb;"
| 16 || April 17 || @ Royals || 3–2 || Pineda (2–1) || Francis (0–1) || League (3) || 19,424 || 5–11 || 
|-  style="text-align:center; background:#fbb;"
| 17 || April 18 || Tigers || 3–8 || Scherzer (3–0) || Lueke (1–1) ||  || 12,774 || 5–12 || 
|-  style="text-align:center; background:#bfb;"
| 18 || April 19 || Tigers || 13–3 || Fister (1–3) || Coke (1–3) ||  || 12,411 || 6–12 || 
|-  style="text-align:center; background:#fbb;"
| 19 || April 20 || Tigers || 2–3 || Porcello (1–2) || Bédard (0–4) || Valverde (4) || 13,339 || 6–13 || 
|-  style="text-align:center; background:#bfb;"
| 20 || April 21 || Athletics || 1–0 || Hernández (2–2) || McCarthy (1–1) || League (4) || 12,770 || 7–13 || 
|-  style="text-align:center; background:#bfb;"
| 21 || April 22 || Athletics || 4–0 || Pineda (3–1) || Ross (1–2) || League (5) || 17,798 || 8–13 || 
|-  style="text-align:center; background:#fbb;"
| 22 || April 23 || Athletics || 1–9 || Cahill (3–0)  || Vargas (0–2) ||  || 25,355 || 8–14 || 
|-  style="text-align:center; background:#fbb;"
| 23 || April 24 || Athletics || 2–5 || Anderson (2–1) || Laffey (0–1) || Fuentes (6) || 16,530 || 8–15 || 
|-  style="text-align:center; background:#bfb;"
| 24 || April 26 || @ Tigers || 7–3 || Hernández (3–2) || Coke (1–4) ||  || 18,027 || 9–15 || 
|-  style="text-align:center; background:#bfb;"
| 25 || April 27 || @ Tigers || 10–1 || Bédard (1–4) || Verlander (2–3) ||  || 18,153 || 10–15 || 
|-  style="text-align:center; background:#bfb;"
| 26 || April 28 || @ Tigers || 7–2 || Pineda (4–1) || Penny (1–3) ||  || 21,176 || 11–15 || 
|-  style="text-align:center; background:#bfb;"
| 27 || April 29 || @ Red Sox || 5–4 || Vargas (1–2) || Jenks (1–2) || League (6) || 37,845 || 12–15 || 
|-  style="text-align:center; background:#bfb;"
| 28 || April 30 || @ Red Sox || 2–0 || Fister (2–3) || Lackey (2–3) || League (7) || 37,901 || 13–15 || 
|-

|-  style="text-align:center; background:#fbb;"
| 29 || May 1 || @ Red Sox || 2–3 || Papelbon (1–0) || Wright (0–1) ||  || 37,079 || 13–16 || 
|-  style="text-align:center; background:#bfb;"
| 30 || May 3 || Rangers || 4–3 || Pauley (1–0) || Strop (0–1) || League (8) || 12,759 || 14–16 || 
|-  style="text-align:center; background:#fbb;"
| 31 || May 4 || Rangers || 2–5 || Wilson (4–1) || Pineda (4–2) ||  || 13,896 || 14–17 ||  
|-  style="text-align:center; background:#bfb;"
| 32 || May 5 || Rangers || 3–1 || Vargas (2–2) || Lewis (2–4) || League (9) || 14,205 || 15–17 || 
|-  style="text-align:center; background:#bfb;"
| 33 || May 6 || White Sox || 3–2 || Hernández (4–2) || Thornton (0–3) ||  || 31,912 || 16–17 || 
|-  style="text-align:center; background:#fbb;"
| 34 || May 7 || White Sox || 0–6 || Floyd (4–2) || Fister (2–4) ||  || 26,288 || 16–18 || 
|-  style="text-align:center; background:#fbb;"
| 35 || May 8 ||  White Sox || 2–5 (10) || Santos (1–0) || League (0–1) ||  || 26,074 || 16–19 || 
|-  style="text-align:center; background:#fbb;"
| 36 || May 10 || @ Orioles || 6–7 (13) || Accardo (2–0) || League (0–2) ||  || 11,485 || 16–20 || 
|-  style="text-align:center; background:#fbb;"
| 37 || May 11 || @ Orioles || 2–4 || Tillman (2–3) || Hernández (4–3) || Gregg (7) || 11,561 || 16–21 || 
|-  style="text-align:center; background:#fbb;"
| 38 || May 12 || @ Orioles || 1–2 (12) || Johnson (2–1) || League (0–3) ||  || 19,082 || 16–22 || 
|-  style="text-align:center; background:#fbb;"
| 39 || May 13 || @ Indians || 4–5 || Sipp (2–0) || League (0–4) ||  || 33,774 || 16–23 || 
|-  style="text-align:center; background:#bbb;"
| – || May 14 || @ Indians || colspan=7|Postponed (rain); Makeup: August 23 (Game 1)
|-  style="text-align:center; background:#bbb;"
| – || May 15 || @ Indians || colspan=7|Postponed (rain); Makeup: September 19
|-  style="text-align:center; background:#bfb;"
| 40 || May 16 || Twins || 5–2 || Pineda (5–2) || Baker (2–3) ||  || 14,859 || 17–23 || 
|-  style="text-align:center; background:#fbb;"
| 41 || May 17 || Twins || 1–2 || Liriano (3–5) || Hernández (4–4) || Capps (6) || 16,015 || 17–24 || 
|-  style="text-align:center; background:#bfb;"
| 42 || May 18 || Angels || 3–0 || Vargas (3–2) || Weaver (6–4) || League (10) || 16,992 || 18–24 || 
|-  style="text-align:center; background:#bfb;"
| 43 || May 19 || Angels || 2–1 || Pauley (2–0) || Downs (1–1) ||  || 18,374 || 19–24 || 
|-  style="text-align:center; background:#bfb;"
| 44 || May 20 || @ Padres || 4–1 || Bédard (2–4) || Latos (1–6) ||  || 26,501 || 20–24 || 
|-  style="text-align:center; background:#bfb;"
| 45 || May 21 || @ Padres || 4–0 || Pineda (6–2) || Richard (2–5) ||  || 34,648 || 21–24 || 
|-  style="text-align:center; background:#bfb;"
| 46 || May 22 || @ Padres || 6–1 || Hernández (5–4) || Stauffer (0–3) ||  || 34,705 || 22–24 ||  
|-  style="text-align:center; background:#bfb;"
| 47 || May 23 || @ Twins || 8–7 (10) || Wright (1–1) || Swarzak (0–2) || League (11) || 37,498 || 23–24 || 
|-  style="text-align:center; background:#fbb;"
| 48 || May 24 || @ Twins || 2–4 || Blackburn (4–4) || Fister (2–5) ||  || 37,691 || 23–25 || 
|-  style="text-align:center; background:#bfb;"
| 49 || May 25 || @ Twins || 3–0 || Bédard (3–4) || Duensing (2–5) || League (12) || 38,860 || 24–25 || 
|-  style="text-align:center; background:#bfb;"
| 50 || May 27 || Yankees || 4–3 || Pauley (3–0) || Ayala (1–1) || League (13) || 33,715 || 25–25 || 
|-  style="text-align:center; background:#bfb;"
| 51 || May 28 || Yankees || 5–4 (12) || Pauley (4–0) || Rivera (1–1) || – || 37,354 || 26–25 || 
|-  style="text-align:center; background:#fbb;"
| 52 || May 29 || Yankees || 1–7 || Sabathia (6–3) || Vargas (3–3) ||  || 37,290 || 26–26 ||   
|-  style="text-align:center; background:#bfb;"
| 53 || May 30 || Orioles || 4–3 || Fister (3–5) || Arrieta (6–3) || League (14) || 22,819 || 27–26 || 
|-  style="text-align:center; background:#bfb;"
| 54 || May 31 || Orioles || 3–2 || Ray (2–1) || Guthrie (2–7) || League (15) || 11,692 || 28–26 || 
|-

|-  style="text-align:center; background:#fbb;"
| 55 || June 1 || Orioles || 1–2 || Johnson (4–1) || Wright (1–2) || Gregg (9) || 18,036 || 28–27 || 
|-  style="text-align:center; background:#bfb;"
| 56 || June 2 || Rays || 8–2 || Hernández (6–4) || Shields (5–4) ||  || 16,376 || 29–27 || 
|-  style="text-align:center; background:#bfb;"
| 57 || June 3 || Rays || 7–0 || Vargas (4–3) || Sonnanstine (0–2) ||  || 24,492 || 30–27 || 
|-  style="text-align:center; background:#fbb;"
| 58 || June 4 || Rays || 2–3 || Hellickson (7–3) || Fister (3–6) || Farnsworth (11) || 28,843 || 30–28 || 
|-  style="text-align:center; background:#bfb;"
| 59 || June 5 || Rays || 9–6 || Wright (2–2) || Howell (0–1) || League (16) || 28,947 || 31–28 || 
|-  style="text-align:center; background:#fbb;"
| 60 || June 6 || @ White Sox || 1–3 || Danks (1–8) || Pineda (6–3) || Santos (11) || 23,847 || 31–29 || 
|-  style="text-align:center; background:#fbb;"
| 61 || June 7 || @ White Sox || 1–5 || Humber (5–3) || Hernández (6–5) ||  || 21,337 || 31–30 || 
|-  style="text-align:center; background:#bfb;"
| 62 || June 8 || @ White Sox || 7–4 (10) || Laffey (1–1) || Santos (2–2) || League (17) || 21,517 || 32–30 || 
|-  style="text-align:center; background:#fbb;"
| 63 || June 9 || @ Tigers || 1–4 || Verlander (7–3) || Fister (3–7) || Valverde (16) || 22,090 || 32–31 || 
|-  style="text-align:center; background:#bfb;"
| 64 || June 10 || @ Tigers || 3–2 || Ray (3–1) || Penny (5–5) || League (18) || 30,511 || 33–31 || 
|-  style="text-align:center; background:#fbb;"
| 65 || June 11 || @ Tigers || 1–8 || Scherzer (8–2) || Pineda (6–4) ||  || 38,398 || 33–32 || 
|-  style="text-align:center; background:#bfb;"
| 66 || June 12 || @ Tigers || 7–3 || Hernández (7–5) || Porcello (6–4) ||  || 31,572 || 34–32 || 
|-  style="text-align:center; background:#fbb;"
| 67 || June 13 ||  Angels || 3–6 || Haren (6–4) || Vargas (4–4) || Walden (15) || 20,238 || 34–33 ||
|-  style="text-align:center; background:#fbb;"
| 68 || June 14 ||  Angels || 0–4 || Weaver (8–4) || Fister (3–8) ||  || 17,634 || 34–34 ||
|-  style="text-align:center; background:#bfb;"
| 69 || June 15 ||  Angels || 3–1 || Bédard (4–4) || Santana (3–7) || League (19) || 19,321 || 35–34 || 
|-  style="text-align:center; background:#bfb;"
| 70 || June 17 ||  Phillies || 4–2 || Pineda (7–4) || Oswalt (4–5) || League (20) || 34,345 || 36–34 || 
|-  style="text-align:center; background:#fbb;"
| 71 || June 18 ||  Phillies || 1–5 || Stutes (1–0) || Hernández (7–6) ||  || 35,829 || 36–35 || 
|-  style="text-align:center; background:#bfb;"
| 72 || June 19 ||  Phillies || 2–0 || Vargas (5–4) || Hamels (9–3) ||  || 45,462 || 37–35 || 
|-  style="text-align:center; background:#fbb;"
| 73 || June 21 ||  @ Nationals || 5–6 || Coffey (3–0) || Pauley (4–1) ||  || 21,502 || 37–36 ||  
|-  style="text-align:center; background:#fbb;"
| 74 || June 22 ||  @ Nationals || 1–2 || Lannan (5–5) || Bédard (4–5) || Storen (18) || 21,367 || 37–37 ||
|-  style="text-align:center; background:#fbb;"
| 75 || June 23 ||  @ Nationals || 0–1 || Clippard (1–0) || Ray (3–2) ||  || 21,161 || 37–38 ||
|-  style="text-align:center; background:#bfb;"
| 76 || June 24 ||  @ Marlins (in Seattle) || 5–1 || Hernández (8–6) || Nolasco (4–4) ||  || 15,279 || 38–38 || 
|-  style="text-align:center; background:#fbb;"
| 77 || June 25 ||  @ Marlins (in Seattle) || 2–4 || Volstad (3–7) || Vargas (5–5) || Núñez (21) || 16,896 || 38–39 || 
|-  style="text-align:center; background:#bfb;"
| 78 || June 26 ||  @ Marlins (in Seattle) || 2–1 (10) || Pauley (5–1) || Choate (0–1) || League (21) || 10,925 || 39–39 || 
|-  style="text-align:center; background:#fbb;"
| 79 || June 27 ||  Braves || 1–3 || Beachy (3–1) || Bédard (4–6) || Kimbrel (21) || 26,467 || 39–40 || 
|-  style="text-align:center; background:#fbb;"
| 80 || June 28 ||  Braves || 4–5 || Hanson (9–4) || Pineda (7–5) || Kimbrel (22) || 21,769 || 39–41 || 
|-  style="text-align:center; background:#fbb;"
| 81 || June 29 ||  Braves || 3–5 || Lowe (4–6) || Hernández (8–7) || Kimbrel (23) || 30,472 || 39–42 || 
|-

|-  style="text-align:center; background:#bfb;"
| 82 || July 1 || Padres || 6–0 || Vargas (6–5) || Moseley (2–8) ||  || 23,616 || 40–42 || 
|-  style="text-align:center; background:#fbb;"
| 83 || July 2 || Padres || 0–1 || Luebke (2–2) || Fister (3–9) || Bell (24) || 22,798 || 40–43 || 
|-  style="text-align:center; background:#bfb;"
| 84 || July 3 || Padres || 3–1 || Beavan (1–0) || Latos (5–9) || League (22) || 28,001 || 41–43 || 
|-  style="text-align:center; background:#bfb;"
| 85 || July 4 || @ Athletics || 2–1 || Pineda (8–5) || McCarthy (1–5) || League (23) || 15,566 || 42–43 ||
|-  style="text-align:center; background:#bfb;"
| 86 || July 5 || @ Athletics || 4–2 (10) || League (1–4) || Bailey (0–1) || Wright (1) || 11,153 || 43–43 || 
|-  style="text-align:center; background:#fbb;"
| 87 || July 6 || @ Athletics || 0–2 || Moscoso (3–4) || Vargas (6–6) || Bailey (8) || 19,491 || 43–44 || 
|-  style="text-align:center; background:#fbb;"
| 88 || July 7 || @ Angels || 1–5 || Weaver (11–4) || Fister (3–10) ||  || 41,223 || 43–45 || 
|-  style="text-align:center; background:#fbb;"
| 89 || July 8 || @ Angels || 3–4 || Walden (2–2) || Pauley (5–2) ||  || 40,161 || 43–46 ||
|-  style="text-align:center; background:#fbb;"
| 90 || July 9 || @ Angels || 3–9 || Piñeiro (5–3) || Pineda (8–6) ||  || 44,111 || 43–47 ||
|-  style="text-align:center; background:#fbb;"
| 91 || July 10 || @ Angels || 2–4 || Haren (10–5) || Pauley (5–3) || Walden (20) || 39,505 || 43–48 ||
|- style="text-align:center;"
| colspan="10" style="background:#bfd6d6;"|All-Star Break
|-  style="text-align:center; background:#fbb;"
| 92 || July 14 || Rangers || 0–5 || Holland (8–4) || Vargas (6–7) ||  || 25,997 || 43–49 ||
|-  style="text-align:center; background:#fbb;"
| 93 || July 15 || Rangers || 0–4 || Lewis (9–7) || Fister (3–11) || Feliz (19) || 30,551 || 43–50 ||
|-  style="text-align:center; background:#fbb;"
| 94 || July 16 ||  Rangers || 1–5 || Wilson (10–3) || Hernández (8–8) ||  || 30,896 || 43–51 || 
|-  style="text-align:center; background:#fbb;"
| 95 || July 17 ||  Rangers || 1–3 || Harrison (8–7) || Beavan (1–1) || Feliz (20) || 30,335 || 43–52 || 
|-  style="text-align:center; background:#fbb;"
| 96 || July 19 || @ Blue Jays || 5–6 (14) || Janssen (3–0) || Wright (2–3) ||  || 15,957 || 43–53 || 
|-  style="text-align:center; background:#fbb;"
| 97 || July 20 || @ Blue Jays || 6–11 || Morrow (7–4) || Vargas (6–8) ||  || 18,093 || 43–54 ||  
|-  style="text-align:center; background:#fbb;"
| 98 || July 21 || @ Blue Jays || 5–7 || Rauch (4–3) || Pauley (5–4) ||  || 23,146 || 43–55 || 
|-  style="text-align:center; background:#fbb;"
| 99 || July 22 || @ Red Sox || 4–7 || Lackey (8–8) || Hernández (8–9) || Papelbon (22) || 38,048 || 43–56 || 
|-  style="text-align:center; background:#fbb;"
| 100 || July 23 || @ Red Sox || 1–3 || Beckett (9–3) || Beavan (1–2) || Papelbon (23) || 38,115 || 43–57 || 
|-  style="text-align:center; background:#fbb;"
| 101 || July 24 || @ Red Sox || 8–12 || Wakefield (6–3) || Pineda (8–7)  ||  || 37,650 || 43–58 || 
|-  style="text-align:center; background:#fbb;"
| 102 || July 25 || @ Yankees || 3–10 || García (9–7) || Vargas (6–9) ||  || 44,365 || 43–59 || 
|-  style="text-align:center; background:#fbb;"
| 103 || July 26 || @ Yankees || 1–4 || Sabathia (15–5) || Fister (3–12) || Rivera (26) || 46,132 || 43–60 || 
|-  style="text-align:center; background:#bfb;"
| 104 || July 27 || @ Yankees || 9–2 || Hernández (9–9) || Hughes (1–3) ||  || 47,090 || 44–60 ||
|-  style="text-align:center; background:#fbb;"
| 105 || July 29 ||  Rays || 0–8 || Niemann (5–4) || Bédard (4–7) ||  || 26,570 || 44–61 || 
|-  style="text-align:center; background:#bfb;"
| 106 || July 30 ||  Rays || 3–2 || Pineda (9–7) || Cobb (3–1) || League (24) || 24,985 || 45–61 || 
|-  style="text-align:center; background:#fbb;"
| 107 || July 31 ||  Rays || 1–8 || Hellickson (10–7) || Vargas (6–10) ||  || 20,382 || 45–62 ||
|-

|-  style="text-align:center; background:#bfb;"
| 108 || August 1 || Athletics || 8–4 || Beavan (2–2) || Cahill (9–10) ||  || 23,335 || 46–62 || 
|-  style="text-align:center; background:#bfb;"
| 109 || August 2 || Athletics || 4–2 || Hernández (10–9) || Harden (2–2) || League (25) || 22,576 || 47–62 || 
|-  style="text-align:center; background:#bfb;"
| 110 || August 3 || Athletics || 7–4 || Furbush (2–3) || Gonzalez (9–9) || League (26) || 29,691 || 48–62 || 
|-  style="text-align:center; background:#fbb;"
| 111 || August 5 || @ Angels || 0–1 (10) || Walden (3–3) || Cortes (0–1) ||  || 38,727 || 48–63 ||
|-  style="text-align:center; background:#bfb;"
| 112 || August 6 || @ Angels || 5–1 || Beavan (3–2) || Chatwood (6–8) ||  || 42,017 || 49–63 || 
|-  style="text-align:center; background:#fbb;"
| 113 || August 7 || @ Angels || 1–2 || Santana (8–8) || Hernández (10–10) || Walden (25) || 38,823 || 49–64 || 
|-  style="text-align:center; background:#fbb;"
| 114 || August 8 || @ Rangers || 2–9 || Harrison (10–8) || Furbush (2–4) ||  || 27,771 || 49–65 || 
|-  style="text-align:center; background:#fbb;"
| 115 || August 9 || @ Rangers || 6–7 || Feliz (2–3) || Gray (0–1) ||  || 25,214 || 49–66 ||
|-  style="text-align:center; background:#bfb;"
| 116 || August 10 || @ Rangers || 4–3 || Vargas (7–10)|| Uehara (1–2) || League (27) || 30,087 || 50–66 || 
|-  style="text-align:center; background:#fbb;"
| 117 || August 12 || Red Sox || 4–6 || Lackey (11–8) || Beavan (3–3) || Papelbon (27) || 40,682 || 50–67 ||
|-  style="text-align:center; background:#bfb;"
| 118 || August 13 || Red Sox || 5–4 || Hernández (11–10) || Beckett (9–5) || League (28) || 41,326 || 51–67 ||
|-  style="text-align:center; background:#bfb;"
| 119 || August 14 || Red Sox || 5–3 || Furbush (3–4) || Wakefield (6–5) || League (29) || 43,777 || 52–67 ||
|-  style="text-align:center; background:#bfb;"
| 120 || August 15 ||  Blue Jays || 6–5 || Wilhelmsen (1–0) || Rauch (5–4) || League (30) || 28,530 || 53–67 ||
|-  style="text-align:center; background:#fbb;"
| 121 || August 16 ||  Blue Jays || 7–13 || Perez (2–2) || Vargas (7–11) ||  || 23,089 || 53–68 || 
|-  style="text-align:center; background:#fbb;"
| 122 || August 17 || Blue Jays || 1–5 || Morrow (9–7) || Beavan (3–4) ||  || 26,579 || 53–69 ||  
|-  style="text-align:center; background:#fbb;"
| 123 || August 19 || @ Rays || 2–3 || Cruz (5–0) || Hernández (11–11) || Farnsworth (22) || 14,884 || 53–70 || 
|-  style="text-align:center; background:#fbb;"
| 124 || August 20 || @ Rays || 0–8 || Hellickson (11–8) || Furbush (3–5) ||  || 20,184 || 53–71 || 
|-  style="text-align:center; background:#fbb;"
| 125 || August 21 || @ Rays || 7–8 || Farnsworth (5–1) || Cortes (0–2) ||  || 17,226 || 53–72 || 
|-  style="text-align:center; background:#bfb;"
| 126 || August 22 || @ Indians || 3–2 || Ruffin (1–0) || Perez (2–6) || League (31) || 21,582 || 54–72 || 
|-  style="text-align:center; background:#fbb;"
| 127 || August 23 || @ Indians || 5–7 || Perez (3–6) || League (1–5) ||  || 22,805 || 54–73 || 
|-  style="text-align:center; background:#bfb;"
| 128 || August 23 || @ Indians || 12–7 || Vasquez (1–0) || McAllister (0–1) || Gray (1) || 22,590 || 55–73 || 
|-  style="text-align:center; background:#bfb;"
| 129 || August 24 || @ Indians || 9–2 ||   Hernández (12–11) || Tomlin (12–7) ||  || 16,037 || 56–73 || 
|-  style="text-align:center; background:#fbb;"
| 130 || August 26 || White Sox || 2–4 || Peavy (6–6) || Furbush (3–6) || Sale (5) || 28,621 || 56–74 ||
|-  style="text-align:center; background:#fbb;"
| 131 || August 27 ||  White Sox || 0–3 || Danks (6–9) || Pineda (9–8) ||  || 30,522 || 56–75 || 
|-  style="text-align:center; background:#fbb;"
| 132 || August 28 ||  White Sox || 3–9 || Floyd (12–10) || Vargas (7–12) ||  || 25,630 || 56–76 ||  
|-  style="text-align:center; background:#bfb;"
| 133 || August 29 ||  Angels || 5–3 || Wilhelmsen (2–0) || Takahashi (3–3) || League (32) || 16,990 || 57–76 ||
|-  style="text-align:center; background:#fbb;"
| 134 || August 30 || Angels || 6–13 || Williams (2–0) || Vasquez (1–1) ||  || 15,536 || 57–77 ||
|-  style="text-align:center; background:#bfb;"
| 135 || August 31 || Angels || 2–1 || Hernández (13–11) || Haren (13–8) ||  || 18,520 || 58–77 ||
|-

|-  style="text-align:center; background:#fbb;"
| 136 || September 1 || Angels || 3–4 || Santana (11–9) || Furbush (3–7) || Walden (27) || 19,453 || 58–78 || 
|-  style="text-align:center; background:#fbb;"
| 137 || September 2 || @ Athletics || 2–9 || Moscoso (7–8) || Vargas (7–13) ||  || 14,972 || 58–79 ||
|-  style="text-align:center; background:#fbb;"
| 138 || September 3 || @ Athletics || 0–3 || McCarthy (7–8) || Pineda (9–9) ||  || 19,732 || 58–80 ||
|-  style="text-align:center; background:#fbb;"
| 139 || September 4 || @ Athletics || 5–8 || Cahill (10–13) || Beavan (3–5) || Bailey (19) || 19,384 || 58–81 ||
|-  style="text-align:center; background:#fbb;"
| 140 || September 5 || @ Angels || 4–7 || Haren (14–8) || Vasquez (1–2) ||  || 35,497 || 58–82 || 
|-  style="text-align:center; background:#bfb;"
| 141 || September 6 || @ Angels || 2–1 || Hernández (14–11) || Santana (11–10) || League (33) || 36,533 || 59–82 || 
|-  style="text-align:center; background:#fbb;"
| 142 || September 7 || @ Angels || 1–3 || Williams (3–0) || Furbush (3–8) || Walden (29) || 37,459 || 59–83 || 
|-  style="text-align:center; background:#bfb;"
| 143 || September 8 || Royals || 4–1 || Vargas (8–13) || Hochevar (10–11) || League (34) || 14,377 || 60–83 ||
|-  style="text-align:center; background:#bfb;"
| 144 || September 9 || Royals || 7–3 || Beavan (4–5) || Francis (5–16) ||  || 14,805 || 61–83 ||  
|-  style="text-align:center; background:#fbb;"
| 145 || September 10 || Royals || 2–4 || Paulino (3–10) || Pineda (9–10) || Soria (27) || 17,884 || 61–84 ||
|-  style="text-align:center; background:#fbb;"
| 146 || September 11 || Royals || 1–2 || Teaford (1–0) || Vasquez (1–3) || Soria (28) || 20,591 || 61–85 ||
|-  style="text-align:center; background:#fbb;"
| 147 || September 12 || Yankees || 3–9 || Hughes (5–5) || Hernández (14–12) ||  || 22,029 || 61–86 ||
|-  style="text-align:center; background:#fbb;"
| 148 || September 13 ||  Yankees || 2–3 || Burnett (10–11) || Furbush (3–9) || Rivera (41) || 18,306 || 61–87 ||
|-  style="text-align:center; background:#bfb;"
| 149 || September 14 ||  Yankees || 2–1 (12) || Delabar (1–0) || Wade (5–1) ||  || 20,327 || 62–87 || 
|-  style="text-align:center; background:#bfb;"
| 150 || September 16 || Rangers || 4–0 || Beavan (5–5) || Wilson (16–7) ||  || 17,607 || 63–87 || 
|-  style="text-align:center; background:#fbb;"
| 151 || September 17 || Rangers || 6–7 || Lewis (13–10) || Vasquez (1–4) || Feliz (27) || 22,159 || 63–88 || 
|-  style="text-align:center; background:#fbb;"
| 152 || September 18 || Rangers || 0–3 || Harrison (13–9) || Hernández (14–13) || Feliz (28) || 21,479 || 63–89 ||  
|-  style="text-align:center; background:#bfb;"
| 153 || September 19 || @ Indians || 12–6 (7) || Furbush (4–9) || Huff (2–6) || || 15,354 || 64–89 || 
|-  style="text-align:center; background:#bfb;"
| 154 || September 20 || @ Twins || 5–4 || Vargas (9–13) || Duensing (9–14) || League (35) || 35,995 || 65–89 ||  
|-  style="text-align:center; background:#bfb;"
| 155 || September 21 || @ Twins || 5–4 || Jimenez (1–0) || Slowey (0–7) || League (36) || 36,263 || 66–89 || 
|-  style="text-align:center; background:#fbb;"
| 156 || September 22 || @ Twins || 2–3 || Nathan (2–1) || Delabar (1–1) || || 37,466 || 66–90 ||  
|-  style="text-align:center; background:#fbb;"
| 157 || September 23 || @ Rangers || 3–5 || Harrison (14–9) || Vasquez (1–5) || Feliz (30) || 43,874 || 66–91 ||  
|-  style="text-align:center; background:#fbb;"
| 158 || September 24 || @ Rangers || 3–7 || Feldman (2–1) || Hernández (14–14) || || 40,242 || 66–92 ||  
|-  style="text-align:center; background:#fbb;"
| 159 || September 25 || @ Rangers || 5–12 || Holland (16–5) || Furbush (4–10) || || 43,508 || 66–93 || 
|-  style="text-align:center; background:#bfb;"
| 160 || September 26 ||  Athletics || 4–2 || Vargas (10–13) || McCarthy (9–9) || League (36) || 17,057 || 67–93 || 
|-  style="text-align:center; background:#fbb;"
| 161 || September 27 ||  Athletics || 0–7 || Cahill (12–14) || Beavan (5–6) ||  || 18,600 || 67–94 ||
|-  style="text-align:center; background:#fbb;"
| 162 || September 28 || Athletics || 0–2 ||  Gonzalez (16–12) || Vasquez (1–6) || Bailey (24) ||  20,173 || 67–95 ||
|-

Standings

Division standings

Record against opponents

Roster

Players Stats

Batting
Note: G = Games played; AB = At bats; R = Runs scored; H = Hits; 2B = Doubles; 3B = Triples; HR = Home runs; RBI = Runs batted in; BB = Base on balls; SB = Stolen bases; AVG = Batting average

Pitching
Note: W = Wins; L = Losses; ERA = Earned run average; G = Games pitched; GS = Games started; SV = Saves; IP = Innings pitched; H = Hits; R = Runs allowed; ER = Earned runs allowed; HR= Home runs allowed; BB = Walks allowed;  SO = Strikeouts

Farm system

References

External links
2011 Seattle Mariners season Official Site 
2011 Seattle Mariners at Baseball Reference

Seattle Mariners seasons
Seattle Mariners season
Seasttle Marin
Seattle Mariners